Plague of the Daleks is a Big Finish Productions audio drama based on the long-running British science fiction television series Doctor Who. It contains a three-part story and a one-part story as well.

Plot
In Stockbridge's future, a zombie plague is loose, and the Daleks are returning.

Cast
The Doctor — Peter Davison
Nyssa — Sarah Sutton
Lysette Barclay — Liza Tarbuck
Isaac Barclay — Keith Barron
Alexis Linfoot — Richenda Carey
Vincent Linfoot — Barry McCarthy
Professor Rinxo Jabery — Richard Cordery
Mrs Withers/Mrs Sowerby/Computer Voice — Susan Brown
Cricketer/Dobson/Daleks - Nicholas Briggs

The Three Companions
The Three Companions bonus feature, Part 10.

Brewster's Story by Marc Platt

Polly - Anneke Wills
The Brigadier - Nicholas Courtney
Thomas Brewster - John Pickard
Gery Lenz - Russell Floyd

Continuity
The Doctor and Nyssa previously encountered the Daleks in The Mutant Phase and Renaissance of the Daleks.

External links
Plague of the Daleks

2009 audio plays
Fifth Doctor audio plays
Dalek audio plays
Zombies and revenants in popular culture
Fiction set in the 5th millennium